"Why Don't We Do This More Often?" is a popular song with music was written by Allie Wrubel and lyrics by Charles Newman, published in 1941.  The song is considered a standard, having been recorded by many artists including Doris Day, Bing Crosby, and Kay Kyser. In the Warner Brothers cartoon "Bugs Bunny Gets the Boid", Bugs Bunny and Beaky Buzzard say the first two lines of the song.

Songs with music by Allie Wrubel

1941 songs